The 2005 Malaysian Grand Prix (officially the 2005 Formula 1 Petronas Malaysian Grand Prix) was a Formula One race held at Sepang on 20 March 2005.

Race report 
This was another dominant win from Renault, as Fernando Alonso secured his first win of the season from pole position. At the start he led from Jarno Trulli, before finishing the race 20-odd seconds ahead of the Italian, claiming Toyota's first ever podium position.

Third place was taken by Nick Heidfeld in the Williams. He had been trailing Alonso's team-mate Giancarlo Fisichella, and his own teammate Mark Webber who collided at the end of lap 35. Having been passed by the Australian, Fisichella attempted to retake the position on the inside heading into the final corner, but lost control and slid into Webber's car.

Fourth was McLaren's Juan Pablo Montoya, after starting from 11th on the grid. He was followed home by Ralf Schumacher, David Coulthard, Michael Schumacher and Christian Klien. This made it four points finishes from four starts for Red Bull Racing. Kimi Räikkönen suffered a puncture immediately after his pitstop, and despite setting the fastest lap was unable to make up enough positions to score any points.

After retiring from the Australian Grand Prix a lap from the end, which caused the rules to be changed, Jenson Button and Anthony Davidson retired on the second lap of the race, both from engine failures. Davidson was substituting at British American Racing, as regular driver Takuma Sato was forced to withdraw with a fever. Alonso's win made him the first Spaniard ever to lead the Formula 1 World Championship.

The race ended Ferrari's run of 22 consecutive podium finishes, which started at the 2003 Italian Grand Prix.

The race also marked Rubens Barrichello's 200th Grand Prix.

The race also marked Toyota's first-ever podium in Formula One and first Asian-licensed constructor to score a podium since 1968 United States Grand Prix when John Surtees drove for Honda in the 3rd place.

Friday drivers 
The bottom 6 teams in the 2004 Constructors' Championship were entitled to run a third car in free practice on Friday. These drivers drove on Friday but did not compete in qualifying or the race.

Classification

Qualifying 

Notes
 – Patrick Friesacher received a 10-place grid penalty for an engine change.

Race

Championship standings after the race

Drivers' Championship standings

Constructors' Championship standings

Note: Only the top five positions are included for both sets of standings.

References

Malaysian Grand Prix
Malaysian Grand Prix
Grand Prix
Malaysian Grand Prix